Jameson Land is a peninsula in eastern Greenland.

Geography
Jameson Land is bounded to the southwest by Scoresby Sound (the world's largest fjord), to the northwest by the Stauning Alps, to the north by Scoresby Land, to the northeast by the Fleming Fjord and the Nathorst Fjord of the Greenland Sea, and to the east by Carlsberg Fjord, the smaller Liverpool Land peninsula branching off, and Hurry Inlet. Its northeastern end is Cape Biot.

The Mestersvig military base is located in the northern part of the peninsula.

Geology
Jameson Land mainly consists of a tilted peneplain of Jurassic sandstone, highest in the east. In the northern end there are also rocks of Triassic age. Two formations are predominant in Jameson Land: the Triassic Fleming Fjord Formation and the Jurassic Kap Stewart Formation.
Triassic fossils of the Fleming Fjord Formation in Jameson Land include: the dipnoi Ceratodus, prosauropod and theropod dinosaurs bones and tracks, sauropod tracks, phytosaurs, temnospondyls, and sharks.

See also
Eudimorphodon
Fleming Fjord Formation

References

Peninsulas of Greenland